Odostomia oblongula is a species of sea snail, a marine gastropod mollusc in the family Pyramidellidae, the pyrams and their allies.

Distribution
This species occurs in the following locations:
 European waters (ERMS scope)
 United Kingdom Exclusive Economic Zone

References

 Marshall, J. T. (1895). New British marine shells. Journal of Malacology. 4: 35-39

External links
 To Biodiversity Heritage Library (2 publications)
 To CLEMAM
 To Encyclopedia of Life
 To USNM Invertebrate Zoology Mollusca Collection
 To World Register of Marine Species

oblongula
Gastropods described in 1895